Novaculops woodi, the Hawaiian sandy or Wood's wrasse, is a species of marine ray-finned fish from the family Labridae, the wrasses. Novaculops woodi was originally described as Xyrichtys woodi in 1901 by the American physiologist and histologist Oliver Peebles Jenkins (1850-1935) with the type locality given as Honolulu. peebles gave this species the specific name woodi in honour of the Stanford University professor of hygiene Thomas Denison Wood.

References

Labridae
Fish described in 1901
Taxobox binomials not recognized by IUCN